Alana Olga Blahoski (born April 29, 1974) is an American ice hockey player from Saint Paul, Minnesota. She won a gold medal at the 1998 Winter Olympics. She graduated from Johnson High School in Saint Paul and played ice hockey at Providence College.

Blahoski coached Djurgårdens IF Hockey 2018–20.

References

External links

1974 births
American women's ice hockey forwards
Ice hockey people from Saint Paul, Minnesota
Ice hockey players at the 1998 Winter Olympics
Living people
Medalists at the 1998 Winter Olympics
Olympic gold medalists for the United States in ice hockey
Providence Friars women's ice hockey players
Sportspeople from Saint Paul, Minnesota
American ice hockey coaches
Djurgårdens IF Hockey (women) coaches
21st-century American women
Swedish Women's Hockey League coaches